Khurram Khan Panni  had served as the Chief Whip of the East Pakistan Provincial Assembly and former Ambassador to Pakistan.

Early life and education 
Khurram Khan Panni was born in 1921, to the Bengali Muslim family known as the Zamindars of Karatia. His father, Masud Ali Khan Panni, was descended from a Pashtun belonging to the Panni tribe, who had migrated from Afghanistan to Bengal in the 16th century where the family became culturally assimilated.

He studied at St. Paul's School, Darjeeling, St. Xavier's Collegiate School, and Presidency University.

Career 
Panni was elected to East Bengal Legislative Assembly but was unseated as he was underage, below 21.

Panni contested the April 1949 election from Tangail as a Muslim League candidate against former Muslim League politician Shamsul Huq. On 26 April 1949, he lost the election to Huq for representing Nagarpur, Mirzapur and Basail.

In 1954, Panni lost the election to Sheikh Mujibur Rahman, candidate of the United Front.

In 1962, Panni was elected to the East Pakistan Provincial Assembly and went on to become whip of the ruling party.

In 1963, Panni was appointed the High Commissioner of Pakistan to Kenya.

During Bangladesh Liberation war, Panni served as the ambassador of Pakistan to the Philippines in 1971. He declared allegiance to Bangladesh during the war along with two other Bengali Pakistan ambassadors, Abdul Momin and Abul Fateh.

In 1974, Panni was appointed the ambassador of Bangladesh to Indonesia. He retired in 1975 and moved to Seattle, Washington, United States.

Personal life 
Panni was the grandson of Wajed Ali Khan Panni, the zamindar of Karatia Zamindari. His maternal grandfather was Abdul Halim Ghaznavi, for whom he worked as a Private secretary.

References 

Bengali politicians
People from Tangail District
Karatia Zamindari family
1997 deaths
1921 births
Pakistani politicians
Pakistani expatriates in Kenya
Pakistan Muslim League politicians
High Commissioners of Pakistan to Kenya
Pakistani expatriates in the Philippines
Ambassadors of Pakistan to the Philippines
Pakistani expatriates in Indonesia
Bangladeshi expatriates in the United States
Bangladeshi diplomats
Ambassadors of Bangladesh to Indonesia
20th-century Bengalis